George Bradley (1833 – 1879) was an American politician and a former member of the Minnesota House of Representatives. He represented District 7, which at that time included portions of Scott County just southwest of the Twin Cities.

Career 
Bradley was elected to the position of speaker pro tem of the Minnesota House of Representatives on December 22, 1857, when then-Speaker John S. Watrous took leave to attend to personal business. When, due to Watrous' prolonged absence, the speaker's chair was declared vacant on March 12, 1858, Bradley was elected speaker in his own right. In 1860 he was appointed receiver of the General Land Office in St. Paul. Abraham Lincoln's call for volunteers prompted him to volunteer as a major in the 7th Minnesota Infantry Regiment. He saw action in Minnesota during the Sioux Uprising and then in Missouri, the Battle of Nashville, Tennessee. and the Battle of Tupelo. By the end of the Civil War he had been made a Lt. Colonel.

References

 

1833 births
1879 deaths
People from Belle Plaine, Minnesota
Members of the Minnesota House of Representatives
Speakers of the Minnesota House of Representatives
19th-century American politicians